The Derby della Capitale, also known as Derby Capitolino and Derby del Cupolone, as well as The Rome Derby in English and Derby di Roma in Italian, is the football local derby in Rome, Italy, between Lazio and Roma. It is considered to be one of the fiercest intra-city derbies in the country, along with the other major local derbies, Derby della Madonnina (Milan derby) and Derby della Mole (Turin derby), and one of the greatest and most hotly contested derbies in Europe.

History

Football rivalry
Lazio was founded in 1900 in Piazza della Libertà, Borough of Prati and initially played at the Rondinella field in the upper-class quartiere of Parioli. Roma began playing at the Motovelodromo Appio and subsequently, when the new stadium was built after only two years, moved to the working-class rione of Testaccio. Thus, the Lazio ultras traditionally occupy the northern end (Curva Nord) and Roma's the southern end (Curva Sud) of the Stadio Olimpico. Making ironic remarks, known as sfottò, focused on the origins of both sets of fans, is a traditional way of teasing between the supporters of Lazio and Roma.

Roma was founded in 1927 as a result of a merger between three teams: Roman, Alba-Audace and Fortitudo, initiated by Italo Foschi. It was the intention of Fascist dictator Benito Mussolini to create a unified Roman club to challenge the dominance of Northern clubs. Thanks to the influence of Fascist general, Giorgio Vaccaro, Lazio were the only major team from Rome to resist the merger, thus a kind of rivalry emerged from the very early years of the coexistence in the same city.

In 1979, Lazio fan Vincenzo Paparelli was hit in the eye and killed by a flare fired by a Roma fan from the opposite end of the stadium, becoming the first fatality in Italian football due to violence.

On 17 December 2000, Lazio's Paolo Negro scored an own goal in a 1–0 Roma victory. Roma eventually went on to lift the scudetto that season, as Lazio finished the season in third place. Negro continues to be taunted by Roma fans for the goal.

The derby on 21 March 2004 was abandoned four minutes into the second half with the score tied at 0–0, when a riot broke out in the stand; the president of the Lega Nazionale Professionisti, Adriano Galliani, ordered referee Roberto Rosetti to suspend the match. The riots began with the spreading of a rumour that a boy had been killed by a police car just outside the stadium. In fact, from last row of the stadium, some fans noticed in the square below a body covered with a white sheet. Later, medics who put the sheet explained that the boy had difficulty breathing, dangerously exacerbated by the air full of tear gas, and then the sheet was used as a filter. The denial by the police, spread through the speakers of the stadium, though it was not able to remove all doubt. Roma captain Francesco Totti then asked for the match to be called off, at which point President Galliani was reached by the referee by mobile phone—from the pitch—and ordered the game postponed. After the match was postponed, a prolonged battle between fans and police, with streets near the stadium being set on fire, eventually resulting in 13 arrests and over 170 injured among the police alone. The match was replayed on 28 March and ended in a 1–1 draw with no crowd trouble.

On 26 May 2013, the teams met in the 2013 Coppa Italia Final, the first cup final in the history of the fixture. Lazio won the match 1–0 with a goal by Senad Lulić in the 71st minute, a low right footed shot from a low cross from the right by Antonio Candreva after the goalkeeper Bogdan Lobonț failed to cut out the crossed ball.

On 15 January 2015, Roma's Francesco Totti, playing in his 40th derby, scored twice to salvage a 2–2 draw for Roma, becoming the all-time leading goalscorer in the fixture. He celebrated by taking a selfie in front of Roma's fans in the Curva Sud, having given his phone to the goalkeeping coach before kick off.

On 4 December 2016, Roma recorded their fourth victory in a row against Lazio and extended their unbeaten run in the fixture to seven games with a 0–2 away victory. However, the game was marred by controversy, with Lazio's Danilo Cataldi sent off for grabbing Roma's Kevin Strootman, after Strootman had thrown the contents of a water bottle in Cataldi's face after scoring the opening goal, sparking a mass brawl. Strootman subsequently received a two match ban for his role in the incident. Lazio's Senad Lulić was also given a 20-day ban for offensive comments made towards Roma's Antonio Rüdiger after the game.

Cultural rivalry

The devout regionalism that is perceived throughout the country is one of the reasons that make the derby more heated, as the fans view it as a battle between two clubs fighting for the right to represent the city in the rest of the country and local bragging rights. This is partly fueled by the fact that Italian football has mostly been dominated by three clubs, all of which are based in Northern Italy – namely Juventus in Turin and Milan and Internazionale in Milan.

The Rome derby has been the scene of several actions related to the political views of the fan bases. A minority of Lazio's ultras used to use swastikas and fascist symbols on their banners, and they have displayed racist behaviour on several occasions during the derbies. Most notably, at a derby of the season 1998–99, laziali unfurled a 50-metre banner around the Curva Nord that read, "Auschwitz is your town, the ovens are your houses". Black players of Roma have often been receivers of racist and offensive behaviour.

In November 2015, Roma's ultras and their Lazio counterparts boycotted Roma's 2–0 victory in the Derby della Capitale in a protest against the new safety measures imposed at the Stadio Olimpico. The measures, imposed by Rome's prefect, Franco Gabrielli, had involved plastic glass dividing walls being installed in both the Curva Sud and Curva Nord, splitting the sections behind each goal in two. Both sets of ultras continued their protests for the rest of the season, including during Roma's 4–1 victory in the return fixture. Lazio's ultras returned to the Curva Nord for Roma's 2–0 victory in December 2016, but the Roma ultras continue to boycott games.

In 2017, Lazio fans left anti-Semitic stickers of Anne Frank in a Roma jersey, as well as graffiti, at the Stadio Olimpico. The resulting controversy prompted anti-racist actions by Series A clubs including Lazio, though some of these actions were opposed by their fans. On 30 April 2017, Lazio beat Roma 3–1 in a Serie A match, and four days later, Lazio ultras hung dummies with Roma jerseys from a pedestrian walkway near the Colosseum in the Italian capital. The mannequins were accompanied with a banner read "a warning without offence...sleep with the lights on!"

Official match results

 SF = Semi-final
 QF = Quarter-final
 R16 = Round of 16
 GS = Group stage
 R1 = Round 1

Statistics and records

The first derby was played on 8 December 1929, and ended 1–0 for Roma with a goal by Rodolfo Volk. Lazio won its first derby on 23 October 1932 with goals by Demaría (L), Volk (R) and Castelli (L).
The best result in a derby was the 5–0 victory for Roma in 1933–34. The best result for Lazio was the 3–0 victory in 2006–07, 2018–19 and 2020–21.
Lazio holds the record of the most victories in a single season, winning four derbies during the 1997–98 season: two in the league (3–1 and 2–0) and two in the quarter-finals of the Coppa Italia (4–1 and 2–1).
Only on one occasion was the derby played as a Cup Final, on 26 May 2013. Lazio won 1–0, winning their sixth Coppa Italia title.

Goalscorers

Players
Francesco Totti has played the most derbies, with 44 for Roma. The player with the most derby appearances for Lazio is Giuseppe Wilson, with 23.
Francesco Totti and Dino da Costa have scored the most goals in the derbies, with each player scoring 11 for Roma. The top scorer for Lazio in the derby is Silvio Piola, with 7 goals.
Vincenzo Montella holds the record for the most goals scored in a single derby; on 11 March 2002, he scored four goals in a 5–1 Roma victory.
Arne Selmosson, Aleksandar Kolarov and Pedro are the only three players which have scored in the derby for both teams.

Honours

Note: Roma won the Inter-Cities Fairs Cup once, but it does not count towards their official European record.

Chronological order of honours
Table correct as of 25 May 2022

Head-to-head ranking in Serie A (1930–2022)

• Total: Roma with 50 higher finishes, Lazio with 29 higher finishes (as of the end of the 2021–22 season)

Notes:
 Only Roma qualified for the final round of 8 teams in 1946; Lazio finished 7th in their group and didn't qualify.
 Both teams finished with the same number of points in 1943, but Lazio had better goal difference.

Players who played for both clubs

Lazio then Roma
 1928:  Fulvio Bernardini (via Inter Milan; then managed both, Roma (1949–1950) and Lazio (1958–1960))
 1935:  Piero Pastore (via Perugia)
 1938:  Attilio Ferraris (return)
 1958:  Arne Selmosson
 1987:  Lionello Manfredonia (via Juventus)
 1995:  Luigi Di Biagio (via Monza, then Foggia)
 2001:  Diego Fuser (via Parma)
 2017:  Aleksandar Kolarov (via Manchester City)

Roma then Lazio
 1927:  Attilio Ferraris (then back to Roma in 1938)
 1938:  Luigi Allemandi (via Venezia)
 1972:  Sergio Petrelli
 1985:  Astutillo Malgioglio
 1993:  Fabrizio Di Mauro (via Fiorentina)
 1998:  Siniša Mihajlović (via Sampdoria)
 2000:  Francesco Colonnese (via Napoli then Inter Milan)
 2000:  Angelo Peruzzi (via Juventus, then Inter Milan)
 2003:  Roberto Muzzi (via Cagliari, then Udinese)
 2004:  Sebastiano Siviglia (via Parma, Atalanta and Lecce)
 2021:  Pedro
 2022:  Alessio Romagnoli (via Milan)

See also
 Football derbies in Italy

References

External links

Five classic Rome derbies over the past fifteen years
Il Derby della Capitale on CBC News

Capitale
A.S. Roma
S.S. Lazio
Football in Rome